Joseph Francis Burns (February 25, 1900 – January 7, 1986) was an American Major League Baseball catcher who played for the Chicago White Sox in .

External links

1900 births
1986 deaths
Chicago White Sox players
Major League Baseball catchers
Baseball players from Trenton, New Jersey